This is a list of active and extinct volcanoes in Solomon Islands.

Volcanoes

References 

Solomon Islands
 
Volcanoes